Hooghly Branch Government School (or Hooghly Branch (Govt) School), established in 1834, is one of the oldest schools in West Bengal. It is located in Chawk Bazar, Hooghly, within the area of Hooghly-Chinsurah Municipality.

The school is administered by the state government of West Bengal and admits only males. The School has two sessions, morning and day session. Students are taught from class 1 to class 12. 

The school's primary medium of instruction is Bengali and English is second language. However, on the higher secondary section, people are allowed to choose the medium of instruction as English.

Notable alumni  
 Sarat Chandra Chattopadhyay, Bengali novelist 
 Bijan Kumar Mukherjea, 4th Chief Justice of India  
 Surajit Sengupta, Footballer

See also
Education in India
List of schools in India
Education in West Bengal

References

External links  
  Hooghly Branch School location at Wikimapia

High schools and secondary schools in West Bengal
Schools in Hooghly district
1834 establishments in British India
Educational institutions established in 1834